Hilary J. Sandoval Jr. (January 29, 1930 – June 11, 1973) was an American businessman who served as Administrator of the Small Business Administration from 1969 to 1971.

He died on June 11, 1973, in El Paso, Texas, from complications of brain surgeries at the age of 43.

References

1930 births
1973 deaths
Administrators of the Small Business Administration
Texas Republicans